USS Chiron was a Portunus-class Motor Torpedo Boat Tender which saw brief service with the United States Navy during World War II. Laid down as Landing Ship, Tank LST-1133 by Chicago Bridge and Iron Company on 16 December 1944, she was launched on 10 March 1945 and placed into reduced commission on 23 March 1945. On 17 April 1945, she was decommissioned for her conversion into a Motor Torpedo Tender. With the conversion taking place in Baltimore, Maryland, it was complete by 18 September 1945, and she was recommissioned into active service as USS Chiron (AGP-18). The ship had a brief naval career, spending only 5 months and 27 days in naval service. She was decommissioned on 20 February 1946, and on 28 March 1946 she was struck from the Naval Register.

Transfer to merchant service
On 19 May 1947, she was sold to Argentina and placed into Merchant Service by 1948 under the name M/V Altamar, reflagged as Argentinian. 22 years later, on 30 March 1960, she was lost at sea by unknown cause while carrying grain from Cabedello to Belem.

Ship awards

American Campaign Medal
World War II Victory Medal

References

External links
Ship details at Navsource.org 
Details at Shipscribe.com
Wrecksite.eu information
Naval Museum article
Ibiblio.org site

1945 ships
Ships of the United States Navy